Barque sortant du port (also known as Boat Leaving the Port) is an 1895 French short black-and-white silent film directed and produced by Louis Lumière.

The film consists of a single shot of a boat leaving the port, being rowed into rough seas by three men. This scene is observed by two women and children who are standing on a nearby jetty.

Production
It was filmed by means of the Cinématographe, an all-in-one camera, which also serves as a film projector and developer. As with all early Lumière movies, this film was made in a 35 mm format with an aspect ratio of 1.33:1.

Current status

Given its age, this short film is available to freely download from the Internet. It has also featured in a number of film collections including The Movies Begin – A Treasury of Early Cinema, 1894–1913 .

References

External links
 Complete Video at Dailymotion
 
 

Films directed by Auguste and Louis Lumière
1895 films
French short documentary films
French silent short films
1890s short documentary films
Black-and-white documentary films
Documentary films about water transport
French black-and-white films
One-shot films
Silent adventure films
1890s French films